Arul Swami (18 December 1913 – 23 October 1997) was an Indian long-distance runner. He competed in the marathon at the 1936 Summer Olympics. Aged 22 in 1936, he was the youngest participant for India at the 1936 Berlin Summer Games.

References

External links
 

1913 births
1997 deaths
Athletes (track and field) at the 1936 Summer Olympics
Indian male long-distance runners
Indian male marathon runners
Olympic athletes of India
Place of birth missing